The Holden V8 engine is an overhead valve (OHV) V8 engine that was produced by the Australian General Motors subsidiary, Holden (GMH), between 1969 and 2000.

The engine was initially fitted to the Holden HT series in 1969 and was later utilised in a series of updated versions in the Torana and Commodore ranges. The final iteration, the heavily revised HEC 5000i, was phased out of Holden passenger vehicles with the release of the VT Series II Commodore and the WH Statesman and Caprice in June 1999, both of which featured the 5.7L Gen III V8 imported from the United States. However, the engine remained in production for a little while longer and continued to be available in the Commodore VS Series III utility (which sold alongside the VT sedan and wagon as no similar vehicle was available in that range) until the new generation VU Ute debuted in late 2000.

In addition to being Holden's mainstream performance engine throughout its production run, higher performance versions were fitted to limited-edition vehicles available through Holden Dealer Team Special Vehicles (HDT) and later Holden Special Vehicles (HSV). It was also utilised within limited production vehicles from other manufacturers as well as in kit cars.
 
The engine has a successful history in various forms of motorsport, most notably in the Australian Touring Car Championship and the Bathurst 1000 until 1995, as well as in Formula 5000 and other racing applications.

It can also be found in Australian powerboats fitted with inboard engines, especially those used for water skiing.

History
In 1964 Ford and Chrysler in the US released V8 versions of their respective Falcon and Valiant models which Holden expected to soon be released in locally assembled or produced versions. In response, in January 1965 the company's engineering division initiated a forward engine program review and concluded that by 1969 a V8 option was a necessity for Holden, with forecasts of 35 per cent of all Holdens sold in 1970 to be V8s, rising to 50 per cent by 1975.

Originally an alloy inlet manifold was specified to reduce weight, but this was changed to iron when problems were encountered in the casting process. The exhaust manifolds were also cast iron but the timing case cover remained as an alloy item.

The initial pre-production engine was the 253, which not only met but greatly exceeded the design targets. The design was also very compact with a width of 22 inches, and was only 80 lb heavier than the  straight six, but producing over 40% more power than that engine in standard form. The first running engine was delivered in October 1966. Unfortunately, the engine failed after just four days testing from a seized oil pump; however, the problem was found to be caused by swarf residue rather than a fault in the design or the quality of the components. Further testing proved that the engine was smoother and more durable than Holden's six cylinder, no mean feat as the 186 was considered a smooth and reliable engine in its day.

The new engines were initially intended to be offered as part of the 1968 Holden HK range, but production issues caused the project to run behind schedule and consequently 307ci Chevrolet engines imported from Canada were used instead. Initially the 283ci engine was to be used but it was replaced in North America for the 1968 GM model year with the 307ci engine hence it was used instead for HK. GMH had already planned to use the 327ci Chevrolet engine in the HK GTS327 and it would have originally been fitted in the HK range alongside 253 and 308 if things had gone as planned. The new engines saw their production release soon after in the HT model range, with the 253 being used for manual vehicles whilst the 307 SBC was retained for automatic vehicles. The 308 however debuted in the HT Brougham at the same time but as automatic only (two different imported 350ci Chevrolet engines (auto and manual versions) replaced the 327 and thus the HK GTS327 became the HT GTS350). The 253 was initially only available with a 2-barrel carburettor while the 308 was only ever available with a 4-barrel carburettor (except for when it was used in Bedford trucks in the late 70's). Once the Canadian 307ci engines were used up the 308 became available across all models in the HT range, including the 2-door Monaro coupe. At the same time an automatic option was made available behind the 253 and a manual was available behind the 308 (previously automatic only when 308 was only available in Brougham).

The 253 and 308 soldiered on essentially unchanged into the HG Holden and HQ Holden Series. The V8 engine also appeared from 1971 in the Statesman range of large size luxury cars which Holden established as a separate marque replacing the Holden-badged Brougham. Initially both the 253 and 308 (and imported 350ci engine) were offered in the HQ V8 Statesman model and 308 standard in HQ Deville but after HQ both the 6cyl and V8 Statesman (Custom) models were dropped leaving the 308 powered HJ Statesman Deville as the base Statesman variety. This continued for the HX, HZ and WB.

At the end of HQ (and earlier for LH Torana release) the 253 and 308 engines were referred to by their metric names: 4.2L and 5.0L. Apart from minor external changes like cable throttle and things to make it fit the Torana properly the 4.2L engine in HJ and LH was the same as the HQ engine. At the HQ to HJ transition GMH changed the power output figures on all engines from "advertised horsepower" to proper GM20 test "SAE Gross hp". The power ratings on all engines dropped. The HT-HQ advertised power figures for the 253 and 308 were respectively: 185 hp and 240 hp. The SAE Gross figures for these engines was 175 hp and 227 hp. GMH Technical and Engineering literature shows these revised power figures for HJ but it took a while for it to appear in Sales literature - LX Torana release information shows the 4.2L as 175 hp and the 5.0L as 250 hp. The HJ 5.0L was a very different engine to the HT-HQ 308 though. It got a raise in compression from 9:1 to 9.7:1 and got a new camshaft which was basically the same valve timing as used in the HK-HQ SBC engines (prior to HJ the 308 used the 253's smaller camshaft but retarded 5 degrees). The revised 5.0L was SAE Gross rated as 250 hp which was a 23 hp gain on the HQ 308. In LH SLR5000 Toranas built after HJ release and LX SLR5000 and SS with RPO L31 built prior to HX Holden this revised 5.0L engine created a very fast car. The revised 5.0L engine performed so well that GMH dropped the planned 400ci engine from HJ Caprice and other optioned HJ Holden as the emissions strangled 400ci SBC out of North America was no benefit over the local 5.0L. The flip side of the extra power and torque meant that the Trimatic transmission that was used prior to HJ was not strong enough for the revised 5.0L in a full size Holden or Statesman so it was replaced with the imported TH400 transmission.

In 1974, both the 253 and 308 engines (now called 4.2L and 5.0L) were added to the Torana range for the first time in the LH series (after an aborted attempt by Holden Dealer Team boss Harry Firth to introduce the V8 to the smaller LJ in 1972 which was stopped by the "supercar scare"). The engines were also offered on the revised LX released in 1976, which from July of that year saw emission-controlled versions of the 'Red' engines introduced to comply with the new ADR27A regulations on fuel and exhaust emissions. The V8 was dropped as an option in the final model in the Torana series, the UC released in 1978. There was a high performance version of the 308 engine built in 1973 by Repco for the Formula 5000 series. It was built as a 302ci (4940cc) engine using a slightly smaller bore than the production 308 (3.960" versus the 308's 4"). It was a far stronger block than the production block and featured 4 bolt mains and 11.7:1 compression with either Lucas fuel injection or Weber carburettors. GMH used some of the ideas and parts for this engine and produced the higher performance 308 engine (RPO L34) for use in the Torana XU2 for Group C racing homologation. The XU2 was not released at the start of LH production and instead a vehicle called the LH SLR5000 was released that used a standard 5.0L engine. A little while into LH, GMH built a limited number of SLR5000 vehicles with an engine with RPO code L34 along with a whole host of other parts fitted to it for homologation - they never used the XU2 package code (due to its links to the Supercar scare) and the car eventually was nicknamed the L34 as it was never given a special vehicle package code like XU1 prior or A9X that followed.

In 1978 with the introduction of the new smaller Commodore as Holden's family car, the final versions of the 'Red' 253 and 308 were available with the initial VB. In 1980 the revised VC saw the introduction of the revised 'Blue' series of engines, available in both capacities, which continued through to the VH in 1982. The VC also saw the introduction of high-performance versions of engine in limited-edition vehicles produced in partnership with Peter Brock's Holden Dealer Team (HDT), with various models subsequently appearing through to the VL range in 1987, when relations between the two companies soured and Holden severed its ties with HDT.

With the release of the 'Black' engine in the VK Commodore in 1984, the 253 was dropped as an option and the 308 was the only capacity of the V8 now available in the Commodore. However, the smaller engine continued to be available in the Holden WB commercial vehicles e.g. the One Tonner cab chassis until the end of 1984. In 1985, a destroked version of the 308, known as the 304 but still sold as a 5.0L engine, was introduced to allow the VK to compete with a lower minimum weight (1325 kg, a saving of 75 kg) under the 4501-5000cc regulations of Group A touring car racing.

In 1988 fuel injection appeared for the first time on a Holden V8 engine, on the VL Commodore SS Group A produced by Holden Special Vehicles (HSV), Holden's new performance partnership with British-based Tom Walkinshaw Racing (TWR); however, this was not a standard production engine, which still continued to feature a carburettor. Later that year the VN introduced the 5000i engine with new cylinder heads and multi-point fuel injection which represented the most extensive redesign of the standard production Holden V8 since its launch in 1969. This engine continued in all subsequent Commodores until 1999 (2000 for the VS Series III Ute), when it was replaced by the US-made all-alloy Gen III LS1 5.7L V8 in the VT Series II.

Design
The Holden V8 is a water-cooled naturally-aspirated 4-stroke gasoline engine featuring eight cylinders arranged in a 90 degrees vee-formation. It is an overhead valve design featuring two valves per cylinder with a camshaft centrally located in the engine block above the crankshaft, driven by a timing chain attached to toothed sprockets, with the camshaft in turn driving the distributor and oil pump. Valve actuation is by hydraulic lifters and pushrods to rocker arms (roller lifters in some models) in the cylinder heads; the lifter bore angle in the engine block is 45 degrees from the block centerline. A belt-driven radiator fan and water pump are located on the front of the engine block taking drive from the main pulley, as is the alternator. The cast iron engine block features a separate pressed steel non-stress bearing sump assembly with the crankshaft located within five main bearing journals secured with 2-bolt bearing caps; 4-bolt main bearing caps featured on later performance versions.

The cast iron cylinder heads are a cross-flow design with wedge-shaped combustion chambers and a single spark plug. In early versions of the engine the inlet and exhaust valves were arranged in a "mirrored" configuration around a longitudinal midpoint in each head i.e. I-E-I-E-E-I-E-I. The co-located exhaust valves in the two centre combustion chambers resulted in a "hot spot" making the heads prone to warping or cracking, especially in performance versions of the engine. For the fuel-injected 5000i version introduced in the 1988 VN Commodore, the cylinder heads were redesigned to a repeated I-E design (a similar layout was previously utilised for the HSV VL Group A SV) for all combustion chambers, delivering better heat distribution and thus greater reliability.

Depending upon the application, induction was either carburettor or fuel-injection (multi-point or sequential, depending on the year). For the 1986 VL Commodore, the engine was modified to run on unleaded fuel which carried forth to all subsequent models.

Applications 
Initially offered in  versions, the engines were intended to be offered as part of the 1968 Holden HK range, but the project ran behind schedule and instead became part of the 1969 HT model range. In the HT, the Holden V8 sold alongside the  Chevrolet Small-Block engine until 1974 with the introduction of the HJ series.

The V8 engine also appeared from 1971 in the Statesman range of large size luxury cars which Holden established as a separate marque, replacing the Holden badged Brougham. In 1974, both the 253 and 308 engines were added to the Torana range for the first time in the LH series (after an aborted attempt by Holden Dealer Team boss Harry Firth to introduce the V8 to the smaller LJ Torana range in 1972 which was stopped by the Supercar scare). The engines were also offered on the LX model range introduced in 1976, but not the final UC range which appeared in 1978.

Both engine capacities were offered on the first VB Commodores which appeared in 1978. The 253 version was not available in the VK Commodore range, released in 1984, but continued in Holden WB commercials until their cessation in late 1984. In 1985, the special editions modified by Holden and their official after-market tuner, Peter Brock's HDT Special Vehicles, began introducing the  version of the engine, created to slip underneath the  engine capacity cut-off in Group A touring car regulations, allowing Commodore competitors to run at a lower competition weight. Due to the complex Group A regulations, this also allowed the racing cars to run bigger wheels and tyres without any drop in power. Indeed, the VK Commodore SS Group A was one of the fastest cars in the world of Group A racing when it hit the tracks in 1986.

Fuel injection replaced the carburettors initially on the VL Commodore SS Group A SV, again with Group A touring car racing in mind, this car produced by Holden's new performance vehicle partner Holden Special Vehicles (HSV) in partnership with British-based Tom Walkinshaw Racing (TWR). While Group A disappeared after the VN model range, the fuel injected  engine, often referred to by its nickname, The Iron Lion, was offered in Commodores until the VS III Commodore utility in 2000, although there were no longer V8 VS III utilities available for sale during the latter part of 2000.

HSV vehicles featured a variety of more powerful versions of the 5.0-litre, which were also available on regular V8 Holdens as part of the SV Enhanced package. Additionally, from 1994 with the VR series, a  "stroker" was standard on the HSV GTS and optional on the HSV Senator, and later on the Statesman/Caprice-based Grange from that model's introduction in 1996.

See also 
 Holden straight-six motor

Notes

References 

Holden engines
Products introduced in 1969
V8 engines
Gasoline engines by model